The Fades Viaduct is a railway viaduct in the Puy-de-Dôme department, central France. At the time of its inauguration on 10 October 1909, it was the tallest bridge in the world, across all categories. As of 2010 it still is the tenth tallest railway viaduct in the world.

Overview
The Fades Viaduct is located close to Les Ancizes-Comps, in the Auvergne region, between the communes of Sauret-Besserve and Les Ancizes-Comps. It spans across the river Sioule. Its construction began on 28 October 1901. From 14 to 16 September 1909 it passed the performance tests, The Fades Viaduct has monumental piers of quarried granite. They each have a base larger than a tennis court.

See also 
 List of world's tallest bridges
 List of bridges in France

External links 

 The world's highest bridges 
 Association Sioule & Patrimoine - 37, avenue du Plan d'eau - 63770 LES ANCIZES-COMPS (France) 
 Building the World's Loftiest Bridge By F. A. Talbot

Railway bridges in France
Bridges completed in 1909
Buildings and structures in Puy-de-Dôme
Truss bridges
Viaducts in France
Steel bridges
Transport in Auvergne-Rhône-Alpes